The Khao Khiao–Khao Chomphu Wildlife Sanctuary is a protected area in the Khao Khiao Massif, in Chonburi Province, Thailand. Founded in 1974, it is an IUCN Category IV wildlife sanctuary, measuring 145 km2 in area.

It is partly covered with dry and moist broadleaf forest in the lower ranges. This is the last forested area in Chonburi Province. The Khao Khiao Open Zoo is at the foot of the mountain area.

References

External links
เขตรักษาพันธุ์สัตว์ป่าเขาเขียว-เขาชมภู่ (Thai)

Protected areas established in 1974
Wildlife sanctuaries of Thailand
Geography of Chonburi province
IUCN Category IV
1974 establishments in Thailand